Pullipadam  is a village in Malappuram district in the state of Kerala, India.

Demographics
At the 2001 India census, Pullipadam had a population of 9214 with 4545 males and 4669 females.

Culture
Pullippadam is a typical Kerala village. It is located on the Northern end of the Nilgiri biosphere. Two by a third of the village is reserve forest. About half of the villagers belong to the tribal community.

Transportation
Pullippadam village connects to other parts of India through Nilambur town.  State Highway No.28 starts from Nilambur and connects to Ooty, Mysore and Bangalore through Highways.12,29 and 181. National highway No.66 passes through Ramanattukara and the northern stretch connects to Goa and Mumbai.  The southern stretch connects to Cochin and Trivandrum.   State.  The nearest airport is at Kozhikode.  The nearest major railway station is at Feroke.

References

 School. Pullipadam LP School

   Villages in Malappuram district
Nilambur area